Code Red is a German-Russian dance and house band currently consisting of Maria Baimler. Past members were Mauro Sharcev and Marc Staudinger.

Discography 
Studio albums
 Party Code - June 20, 2008 (Poland) / July 14, 2008 (Czech Republic)

Singles
 2007 – Kanikuly
 2008 – 18
 2008 – Shut up
 2008 – Too Sexy
 2008 – Hot Hot Hot
 2009 – My Angel
 2009 – Bang Bang

External links 
 
 
 Code Red at Bubblegum Dancer
 Official Homepage

Russian dance musicians
Russian pop music groups
German pop music groups
German dance music groups